Ville Kyrönen (14 January 1891 – 24 May 1959) was a Finnish long-distance runner. Kyrönen won a silver medal in the team cross country event at the 1912 Summer Olympics. He also ran in the marathon at the 1924 and 1932 Summer Olympics.

References

External links
 

1891 births
1959 deaths
Athletes (track and field) at the 1912 Summer Olympics
Athletes (track and field) at the 1924 Summer Olympics
Athletes (track and field) at the 1932 Summer Olympics
Finnish male long-distance runners
Finnish male marathon runners
Medalists at the 1912 Summer Olympics
Olympic athletes of Finland
Olympic silver medalists for Finland
People from Kuopio Province (Grand Duchy of Finland)
People from Nilsiä
Finnish male modern pentathletes
Finnish pentathletes
Olympic silver medalists in athletics (track and field)
Olympic cross country runners
Sportspeople from North Savo